HMS Galatea was an  light cruiser of the Royal Navy. She was built by Scotts Shipbuilding & Engineering Co. (Greenock, Scotland), with the keel being laid down on 2 June 1933. She was launched on 9 August 1934, and commissioned 14 August 1935.

History
Galatea joined the Mediterranean Fleet on commissioning and except the period from March till September 1938 acted as flagship, Rear Admiral (Destroyers). Based in Malta, upon the outbreak of the Spanish Civil War she was active in joint patrols enforcing the non-intervention policy, periodically in co-operation with Deutschland and Italian destroyers. Later deployed in Alexandria, she remained on alert in course of the Italian invasion of Abissynia. In the spring and summer of 1938 on refit in Devonport, she was recommissioned for the Mediterranean, deployed at Malta and Alexandria. On 29 March 1939 in Gandia Galatea took on board the leader of the National Defence Council colonel Segismundo Casado and his entourage; the following day she sailed off and on 31 March Casado was transferred to the hospital ship Maine.

After the outbreak of Second World War she was ordered home, and between February and March 1940 she took part in the operations to intercept Axis merchantmen attempting to break out of Vigo. In April 1940 she was involved in the Norwegian Campaign, leaving on 25 April transporting part of the Norwegian National Treasury to Britain, and in May joined the Nore Command as Flagship of the 2nd Cruiser Squadron.

On 4 April 1940, the Polish destroyers ,  and  reached their new homebase Rosyth. In the afternoon they left the harbour with Galatea, her sister ship  and three destroyers. They were ordered to conduct a patrol in the North Sea and were later ordered to intercept German invasion groups heading for Norway.

Arriving at Åndalsnes in late April with troops for the Norwegian campaign she returned to Rosyth with 200 crates, weighing 40 kiloes each, from the Norwegian national treasury.

In June 1940 she was involved in the Operation Aerial evacuation of troops from Saint-Jean-de-Luz France, including Sir Ronald Hugh Campbell, the British Ambassador to France.

On 7 September 1940 the code word Cromwell was issued meaning that the Germans might land in Kent at dawn. During that night Galatea was sent to patrol the Straits of Dover but made no contact with the enemy. At dawn while returning to port she struck a mine off Sheerness and spent three months in dry dock.

In July 1941 she joined the Mediterranean Fleet via the Red Sea, and by November was based at Malta with Force "K", operating against the Axis supply convoys to North Africa.

Fate

In popular culture
Author Ian Fleming named the character Gala Brand in his third James Bond novel Moonraker after the vessel, her Royal Navy father's ship.

Notes

Footnotes

References

External links
 HMS Galatea Memorial web page
HMS Galatea at naval-history.net
Casualty list
HMS Galatea at Uboat.net

 

Arethusa-class cruisers (1934)
Ships built on the River Clyde
1934 ships
World War II cruisers of the United Kingdom
Ships sunk by German submarines in World War II
World War II shipwrecks in the Mediterranean Sea
Maritime incidents in Egypt
Maritime incidents in December 1941